Kuutsi is a village in Rõuge Parish, Võru County in southeastern Estonia. Between 1991–2017 (until the administrative reform of Estonian municipalities) the village was located in Mõniste Parish.

Kuutsi is the location of Mõniste Peasant Museum.

References

External links
Mõniste Peasant Museum 

Villages in Võru County
Kreis Werro